The Fred W. Meier Round Barn was a historic building located near Ludlow in rural Allamakee County, Iowa, United States. It was built in 1912 by Fred W. Meier. The building was a true round barn that measures  in diameter. The bottom half of the barn was constructed in stone and featured red horizontal siding, 2-pitch conical roof, aerator and an internal wood stave silo. It was listed on the National Register of Historic Places in 1986. The structure was destroyed in a thunderstorm during the night of July 27, 2002.

References

Barns on the National Register of Historic Places in Iowa
Buildings and structures completed in 1912
Buildings and structures in Allamakee County, Iowa
Round barns in Iowa
1912 establishments in Iowa
National Register of Historic Places in Allamakee County, Iowa